Tamafaiga or Tamafainga (died 1829) was a Samoan king.

Tamafaiga was a war-priest from Manono Island who usurped the throne after the death of Safeofafine. He came to power after defeating Mataʻafa in 1827 or 1828. He ruled as a tyrant, and was worshiped as a god. The missionary John Williams reported that "he was the man in whom the spirit of the gods dwelt... the terror of all the inhabitants". He was killed by the people of the village of Fasito'o Uta after attempting to claim a daughter of their high chief as his hundredth wife. Following his death Malietoa decimated Aʻana as punishment, and eventually claimed the kingship.

Sources

1829 deaths
Samoan chiefs
People from Aiga-i-le-Tai